The men's 1500 metres race of the 2015–16 ISU Speed Skating World Cup 2, arranged in the Utah Olympic Oval, in Salt Lake City, United States, was held on November 20, 2015.

Kjeld Nuis of the Netherlands won the race, while Joey Mantia of the United States came second, and Shani Davis of the United States came third. Takuro Oda of Japan won the Division B race.

Results
The race took place on Friday, November 20, in the afternoon session, with Division A scheduled at 15:15, and Division B scheduled at 16:52.

Division A

Note: NR = national record.

Division B

Note: NR = national record, NRJ = national record for juniors.

References

Men 01500
2